Mohnton is a borough in Berks County, Pennsylvania, United States. It had a population of 3,043 in the 2010 census.

History
The earliest post office in Mohnton was called Mohn's Store. A post office was established at Mohn's Store in 1857, the post office was renamed Mohnton in 1906, and it remains in operation.

Geography
Mohnton is located in southern Berks County at  (40.286242, -75.985936), part of the contiguous urban area surrounding the city of Reading. It is bordered on all sides by Cumru Township, including the unincorporated community of Pennwyn on the borough's eastern border. Wyomissing Creek flows through the center of Mohnton.

Demographics

As of the census of 2000, there were 2,963 people, 1,211 households, and 842 families living in the borough. The population density was 3,396.0 people per square mile (1,315.0/km2). There were 1,259 housing units at an average density of 1,443.0 per square mile (558.7/km2). The racial makeup of the borough was 96.79% White, 1.11% African American, 0.07% Native American, 0.44% Asian, 0.88% from other races, and 0.71% from two or more races. Hispanic or Latino of any race were 1.69% of the population.

There were 1,211 households, out of which 35.2% had children under the age of 18 living with them, 54.8% were married couples living together, 11.9% had a female householder with no husband present, and 30.4% were non-families. 26.3% of all households were made up of individuals, and 8.8% had someone living alone who was 65 years of age or older. The average household size was 2.44 and the average family size was 2.95.

In the borough the population was spread out, with 25.6% under the age of 18, 6.5% from 18 to 24, 32.5% from 25 to 44, 22.5% from 45 to 64, and 12.9% who were 65 years of age or older. The median age was 37 years. For every 100 females there were 89.8 males. For every 100 females age 18 and over, there were 83.7 males.

The median income for a household in the borough was $41,429, and the median income for a family was $56,174. Males had a median income of $40,037 versus $25,266 for females. The per capita income for the borough was $21,268. About 3.2% of families and 4.9% of the population were below the poverty line, including 6.8% of those under age 18 and 3.2% of those age 65 or over.

Sports

Notable person
 

John N. Wenrich (1917–2011), American artist

Transportation

No numbered highways pass through Mohnton. The main thoroughfares through the borough include Wyomissing Avenue and Church Street, which intersect near the center of town.

References

External links

 Borough of Mohnton official website

Populated places established in 1846
Boroughs in Berks County, Pennsylvania
1846 establishments in Pennsylvania